Truro School is a coeducational private boarding and day school located in the city of Truro, Cornwall, England. It is the largest coeducational independent school in Cornwall with over 1050 pupils from pre-prep to sixth form. It is a member school of the Headmasters' and Headmistresses' Conference.

History
Truro Wesleyan Middle Class College (referred to as Truro College) was founded by Wesleyan Methodists in November 1879, and on 20 January 1880 lessons began at sites in River Street and Strangways Terrace, Truro. The present site was completed in 1882. The school was founded as an alternative to the Church of England's ancient Truro Grammar School. The name Truro College was changed to Truro School in 1931 when it was considered that it was "pretentious...to claim the style of "College" if its pupils are for the most part below the age of 18". The preparatory department was opened in 1936. Girls were admitted into the sixth form in 1976, and it became fully co-educational in 1990. In 2005, a history of the school entitled High on the Hill was produced by Joanna Wood to commemorate its 125th anniversary.

There have been 12 headmasters appointed since the foundation of the school 141 years ago:
George Turner (1880–1887), Thomas Jackson (1887–1890), Herbert Vinter (1890–1921), Egbert H. Magson (1921–1946), A. Lowry Creed (1946–1959), Derek Burrell (1959–1986)
Barry Hobbs (1986–1991), Brian Jackson, Acting Headmaster (1991–1992), Guy Dodd (1992–2001), Paul Smith (2001–2012), Andrew Gordon-Brown (2013–2020) and Andy Johnson (2020 -)

Admission and fees
Pupils must sit an entrance exam, the equivalent of an 11+ exam, although some pupils take the equivalent 13+ exam as certain local schools still teach up to year 9 (year 3).  Academic, and occasionally music, artistic or sports scholarships, are also awarded as well as are means-tested bursaries. Current fees per term range from £3,200 - £4,500 at the Prep School for Nursery and Prep day pupils to £4,900 for senior school day pupils and £9,700 - £10,600 for full boarders.

In November 2005 the school was one of 50 private schools found guilty of running an illegal price-fixing cartel, exposed by The Times, which had resulted in them increasing fees for thousands of parents. Each school was required to pay a nominal penalty of £10,000 and all agreed to make an ex-gratia payment, collectively totalling £3 million, into a trust designed to benefit pupils who attended the schools during the period where the fee information was shared.
Headmaster Paul Smith said that the school had acted "unwittingly". "This ... systematic exchange of confidential information as to intended fee increases was anti-competitive and resulted in parents being charged higher fees than would otherwise be the case," the Office of Fair Trading said.

Site and facilities
Built on a hilltop overlooking Truro, the senior school's campus' facilities include the school chapel, Burrell Theatre (named after Derek Burrell, headmaster from 1959 to 1986), a covered and heated swimming pool, two gymnasiums,  of sports fields, tennis and squash facilities, an astro-turf pitch, the newly refurbished Dodd library, and the Sir Ben Ainslie Sports' Centre, opened by former pupil Ben Ainslie in 2013. The senior school is almost entirely situated on a hill and is not adapted for disabled students.

Form and house system
The school uses the traditional numbering system for year groups: the lower school – years 1 to 5, and the sixth form – lower- and upper-sixth years.  This is equivalent to years 7 to 13 in modern state schools. Years 1 to 3 are split into forms for most lessons although Maths and Foreign languages are structured into sets according to ability. For the GCSE (years 4 and 5) forms are sub-divided into smaller sets for most subjects. This continues into the sixth form.

Houses
Each pupil is placed into a school 'house' used for inter-school competitions and sports matches:

  School
  Smith
  Vinter
  Wickett

The four houses compete for the Opie Shield over many sporting events for boys, girls and mixed teams across all year groups.

Boarding
Though the majority of students are day-pupils, there are also some 80 boarders, of whom half are from overseas, including German exchange students who spend up to three terms in the Lower Sixth.

The school has three boarding houses one for boys and two for girls:

Malvern – Senior girls, Sixth form, ages 16–18
Pentreve – Junior girls, first–fifth year, ages 11–15
Trennick – Boys, first–fifth year, and Sixth form, ages 11–18

Trennick is the only boarding house situated in the school's original main building, although the other two are on the campus. They are family-run communities with married resident house staff and other teachers who live on site. Temporary and 'flexi-boarding' are also available.

Preparatory and pre-preparatory school
Truro School has its own feeder co-ed school for the age group 3–11. Originally named Treliske School, it was founded in 1936 and is situated within the grounds of Truro Golf Course, and is adjacent to Treliske Hospital. It was now called Truro Prep School. Originally a boys school, it became co-educational in 1989. The building to accommodate Willday House, the Pre-Preparatory School originally located in Trennick Lane, was added in 1991. In 2010 an extension to double the size of the Willday House was completed to accommodate an increased demand for Pre-Prep pupils. Entry is academically selective and there were 240 pupils (135 boys, 105 girls) in the 2008–09 academic year. 2018 fees range from £2965to £4330 per term. There have only been five head teachers in 83 years since the school was established in 1936: They were Tommy Stratton: 1936 – 1960, Alan Ayers: 1960 – 1989, Russell Hollins: 1989 – 2004, Matthew Lovett: 2004 – 2016 and Sarah Patterson: 2016 – present.

School uniform
The school uniform for the lower years is a navy blazer with the white school crest on the breast pocket and a blue tie with brown and white diagonal stripes.  
Until recently, ties were awarded for performance in activities which could either be full or half colours; these featured a plain blue tie with a crest on it (previously a full colour pattern of the schools crest). This system has been changed to one of 'badges', worn on the blazer (lower school) or jacket (sixth form), awarded for music, drama and sports. The rest of the uniform consists of a white shirt/blouse with black trousers or a school kilt for girls. In 2004, the sixth form moved away from the wearing of school uniform, and introduced 'business dress' for the pupils. Jackets must still be worn, with a formal shirt and tie for boys.

Curriculum
The school teaches the full range of arts, science and social science subjects to GCSE and A-Level. The sciences are taught as three separate subjects as this allows students a greater choice of A-Level options and beyond. From 2007/2008 onwards the three separate sciences became compulsory subjects for GCSE in place of the previous option to take up a combined science course in the 4th year. Geology has also been introduced as a GCSE option. French and German are both taught in the first, second and third year. All students are required to take a Humanities subject (History or Geography) and a foreign Language (French, German or Spanish). Physical Education (PE) becomes optional from fourth year onwards, but students can choose to take it at GCSE and A-level standard.

School publications
The students produce three magazines: Apparatus Criticus (English), Rigor Mortis (History) and Spark (Current Affairs), the latter being established by Upper Sixth pupils in September 2008. All students receive a copy of Terraces, a magazine highlighting events from the previous year, at the beginning of September. This magazine is produced within the school by a member of staff. A twice yearly newsletter is also sent to the homes of pupils.

Notable alumni

Notable alumni of Truro School include: 
 Jaws actor Robert Shaw
 Queen drummer Roger Taylor
 Actor John Rhys-Davies 
 Actor Nigel Terry
Hong Kong actor Lawrence Ng
 Automobile designer Geoffrey Healey
 International opera singers Benjamin Luxon and Alan Opie
 England international rugby union captain John Kendall-Carpenter
 George Eustice, MP and current Secretary for the Environment, Food and Rural Affairs
 Paul Myners, businessman and former government minister
 Sir John Curtice, professor of Politics, University of Strathclyde & polling guru who was knighted in the Queens 2017 New Years Honours.
 Sir Ben Ainslie, Olympic sailor and four times gold medallist
 Michael Adams, Chess Grandmaster
 Sir Patrick Vallance FRS FMedSci FRCP, Chief Scientific Adviser to the Government of the United Kingdom
 Ros Atkins, BBC journalist and broadcaster

Notes

References

External links

Truro School website
Truro Prep website
Former Pupils' Association
ISI Inspection Report

Educational institutions established in 1880
Member schools of the Headmasters' and Headmistresses' Conference
Truro
Boarding schools in Cornwall
Private schools in Cornwall
Methodist schools in England
1880 establishments in England